Warwickshire 2 was a tier 10 English Rugby Union league with teams from Warwickshire taking part.  Promoted teams moved up to Warwickshire 1 and there was no relegation since the cancellation of Warwickshire 3 back in 1992.  Warwickshire 2 was cancelled at the end of the 2005–06 season with the majority of teams transferred into the newly introduced Midlands 6 West (South-East) or Midlands 6 West (South-West).

Original teams

When league rugby began in 1987 this division contained the following teams:

Berkswell & Balsall
Coventry Saracens
Earlsdon
Harbury
Manor Park
Pinley
Rugby Welsh
Southham
Spartans
Silhillians
Standard

Warwickshire 2 honours

Warwickshire 2 (1987–1992)

The original Warwickshire 2 was a tier 9 league with promotion up to Warwickshire 1 and relegation to Warwickshire 3.  At the end of the 1991–92 season the merging of all Staffordshire and Warwickshire leagues meant that Warwickshire 2 was discontinued for the years that these leagues were active.

Warwickshire 2 (2000–2006)

The restructuring of the Warwickshire league into two single divisions would see the reintroduction of Warwickshire 2 after an absence of seven years, this time at tier 10.  Promotion was to Warwickshire 1 and there was no relegation.  At the end of the 2005–06 season Warwickshire 2 was cancelled and all teams transferred to the newly introduced Midlands 6 (South-East) and Midlands 6 (South-West).

Number of league titles

Harbury (2)
Manor Park (2)
Coventry Saracens (1)
Coventry Technical (1)
GEC Coventry (1)
Pinley (1)
Southam (1)
Standard (1)
Stoke Old Boys (1)

See also
Warwickshire 1
Warwickshire 3
Midlands RFU
Warwickshire RFU
English rugby union system
Rugby union in England

Notes

References

10
Rugby union in Warwickshire